Lamotrek is a coral atoll of three islands in the central Caroline Islands in the Pacific Ocean, and forms a legislative district in Yap State in the Federated States of Micronesia.
The population of Lamotrek was 373 in 2000, living on almost 1 km2.

Geography

Among the individual islets are the following:
 Falaite (northwest)
 Pugue (northeast)
 Lamotrek (southeast)

History
Before European rule, Lamotrek was invaded by Ifalik during Mweoiush's reign, with aid from the Mailiyas. As with all of the Caroline Islands, sovereignty passed to the Empire of Germany in 1899. The island came under the control of the Empire of Japan after World War I, and was subsequently administered under the South Seas Mandate. Following World War II, the island came under the control of the United States of America and was administered as part of the Trust Territory of the Pacific Islands from 1947, and became part of the Federated States of Micronesia from 1979.

Further reading
 Werle, Kerstin J. S.: Landscape of Peace: Mechanisms of Social Control on Lamotrek Atoll, Micronesia. [A Social Anthropology Study in the Era of Globalization]. Wiesbaden, Germany: Springer VS, 2014.  (print);  (eBook)

References
 Columbia Gazetteer of the World. Vol. 1, p. 900

External links

 Lamotrek Site on Triton Films

Islands of Yap
Municipalities of Yap
Atolls of the Federated States of Micronesia